Love You, Mean It with Whitney Cummings was a weekly American talk show series that was broadcast on E!. The series premiered on November 28, 2012. E! initially ordered six episodes of the series and later agreed for six more episodes in January 2013. The series was eventually canceled.

Premise
The series featured Whitney Cummings voicing her comedic opinions about current events. Julian McCullough served as Whitney's co-host.

Episodes

Reception
The series has been widely compared to Chelsea Handler's series Chelsea Lately. Cummings has responded to the comparison with Handler by saying she expects to be more deferential to her guests than Handler often is.

Broadcast
In Australia, the series premiered on December 2, 2012 on E!.

References

External links
 

2010s American television talk shows
2012 American television series debuts
2013 American television series endings
English-language television shows
E! original programming